Enrique Atanasio Villalba Flor (born 2 January 1955) is a former Paraguayan football striker. Villalba was a member of Paraguay national team and he won 1979 Copa América with the team.

Honours

Club
 Olimpia
 Paraguayan Primera División: 1978, 1979
 Copa Libertadores: 1979
Copa Interamericana: 1979
Intercontinental Cup: 1979

International
 Paraguay
 Copa América: 1979

References

External links
 
 

1955 births
Living people
Paraguayan footballers
Paraguay international footballers
Copa América-winning players
1979 Copa América players
Club Olimpia footballers
Cerro Porteño players
R.S.C. Anderlecht players
Tecos F.C. footballers
Tampico Madero F.C. footballers
Club Atlético River Plate footballers
Sport Colombia footballers
Association football forwards